Michael Prior (born 6 September 1973) is a former Australian rules footballer who played for the AFL's Essendon Football Club and the West Coast Eagles.

Drafted third overall in the 1992 AFL Draft, he made the unusual choice at the time to remain with his original club, East Perth, for the 1993 season, Essendons famous 'Baby Bombers' premiership winning year, as he felt that playing regular league football in the WAFL would be better for his development. Essendon coach Kevin Sheedy disagreed with this theory but allowed him to do so.

He played 81 games for the Bombers between 1994 and 2000. After the 2000 season, he was dropped by the Bombers and then picked up by West Coast. He spent two seasons with the Eagles and played just nine games for them due to a devastating knee injury suffered in Round 7 2001, he recovered and continued his tally of games with East Perth in the WAFL when not required and was a member of their 2002 premiership side.

After retiring from AFL football he continued to play with East Perth until the end of the 2003 season. In total he played 69 games for the Royals.

He was colourfully referred to by 3AW commentator Rex Hunt as "prior conviction".

References

"Essendon Football Club Official Website - Draft History", retrieved 10 June 2006.

External links

1973 births
Living people
East Perth Football Club players
Essendon Football Club players
West Coast Eagles players
Australian rules footballers from Western Australia
Western Australian State of Origin players